State Route 86 (SR 86) is part of Maine's system of numbered state highways, located in the far eastern part of the state.  It is a minor connecting route, running  from an intersection with SR 191 near East Machias to an intersection with U.S. Route 1 (US 1) in Dennysville. SR 86 runs mostly through unincorporated forest land.

Route description
SR 86 begins at an intersection with SR 191 in Marion Township, part of the unorganized territory of East Central Washington, just outside East Machias.  SR 86 proceeds eastward through unincorporated Edmunds Township into the town of Dennysville, where it ends at US 1.  SR 86 is named King Road in Dennysville.

Junction list

References

External links

Floodgap Roadgap's RoadsAroundME: Maine State Route 86

086
Transportation in Washington County, Maine